The BMW R12 and R17 are flat-twin engine motorcycles made by BMW Motorrad from 1935 through 1942. They were developed in 1935 based on the R7 concept of 1934. A few hundred R17s were made, ending in 1937, while the R12 continued through 1942, with a total of 36,008 produced.

R7 concept

The BMW R7 was conceived in 1933 by engineer and designer Alfred Böning, with an Art Deco mathematical geometric basis of his design. Only one R7 was ever made, which Böning disassembled and stuck away with design plans in a BMW warehouse. It was discovered more than seventy years later, in 2005. Hans Keckeisen in Munich began a restoration on behalf of the BMW Museum, completed 2012. After appearing in European bike shows, restored 1934 R7 was first shown in the US at the Pebble Beach Concours d'Elegance.

Böning's new hydraulic fork design of the 1934 R7 went into production the following year, in the 1934 R12 and R17.

R12 and R17

On 14 February 1935, BMW presented the R12 together with the R17 on the German Automobile Exhibition in Berlin for the first time, being a direct successor to the BMW R11. This and the R17 were the first in the world being produced with hydraulically damped telescopic forks. By 1942, the total number of BMW R12 motorcycles manufactured was 36,000. For military purposes, the single carburetor Einvergasermotor was only available for the R12.

Engine
The engine, designated M 56 S 6 or 212, was a twin-cylinder boxer configuration - four stroke with a flathead design. The BMW R12 with two carburetors used a battery and coil ignition, while R12s with a single carburetor used a magneto ignition, capable of working independently from the battery.

Drive
The BMW R12 had a four-speed manual gearbox, operated by a hand shift lever on the fuel tank's right side. Several detail variations were seen in production.  In common with most BMW Motorcycles, final drive was via shaft, with the drive shaft on the right side of the motorcycle.

Suspension and brakes
Front suspension used a telescopic fork, while the frame was rigid with an un-sprung rear end supporting the final drive and a sprung seat for the rider. The R12 used drum brakes front and rear.  Many R12's were equipped with a sidecar attached to the motorcycle's right side.

Specifications

Surviving motorcycles
A BMW R12 is in the Museum of Military History in Vienna, in its original camouflage. In 2018, an American company created a modified BMW R nineT with a close resemblance to the original R7, showing the R7-inspired custom at several shows and museums, and selling kits or complete bikes to the public.

See also
 History of BMW motorcycles

References

R12
World War II military vehicles of Germany
Military motorcycles
Research and development in Nazi Germany
Motorcycles introduced in the 1930s
Military vehicles introduced in the 1930s